Trademark share is a company's share of registered and unregistered trade marks in a particular industry or market segment.  It is a key metric and one of many useful tools, when appropriately used, to understand how well positioned a company is to gain some competitive advantage (e.g. more profit or revenue, better ROI on ad campaigns, defend or increase market share) within an industry or market segment.

References

 "Trademarks in Social Gaming - A Key Indicator of Success for Game Developers (Part I)" , Feb 28, 2010

Trademark law